Carla Piluso (born 1955/56) is an American politician and former police officer. She was the first woman to serve as chief of the Gresham Police Department in Gresham, Oregon. In 2014, she won election as a Democrat to the Oregon House of Representatives, representing District 50. Piluso served in the Gresham Police Department for 30 years, beginning in 1979. She is also on the school board for the Gresham-Barlow School District. She was an unsuccessful candidate for Multnomah County commissioner in 2008.

Personal life
Piluso grew up in Multnomah County. She is an alumna of Willamette University in Salem. She has a daughter, Kate. According to her campaign website, she was the first woman to hold every rank at the Gresham Police Department, including the position of chief of police.

External links
 Campaign website
 Legislative website

References

Living people
Democratic Party members of the Oregon House of Representatives
People from Gresham, Oregon
Willamette University alumni
American municipal police chiefs
Year of birth missing (living people)
Place of birth missing (living people)
Oregon police officers
21st-century American politicians